The Tagblatt-Pokal was the first football competition in Austria played in a league format. It was founded by the Neue Wiener Tagblatt, and was restricted to clubs in Vienna. Nevertheless, and despite the existence of the Challenge Cup, which was open to all football clubs in Austria-Hungary, it is regarded as a forerunner of the Austrian football championship. The trophy was awarded permanently to Wiener AC in 1903 after they had won it three times.

Divisions
It was organised in a first division (Erste Klasse) and two parallel second divisions (Zweite Klasse A and Zweite Klasse B). It was planned that the bottom two clubs from the top division should be relegated, and that the winners of the two second divisions should be promoted.

Seasons

1900-01

 
Promoted:
 SK Graphia Wien
 Hernalser F.u.AC Vorwärts

AC Viktoria Wien was also placed in the top division, but after turning down the participation joined the competition in Spring 1901 and played at the second level, and were relegated to that level for the 1901-02 season.

1901-02

1902-03

 
Play-off: SK Rapid Wien – Deutscher Sportverein 3-0
 
Promoted: SK Rapid Wien

1903-04

Wiener AC - First Vienna FC 1894 2-0
SK Graphia Wien - Deutscher SV 4-0
Wiener AC - SK Rapid Wien 15-2

apparent later results
SK Rapid Wien - Vienna Cricket & FC 2-1  
First Vienna FC 1894 - SK Rapid Wien 2-2

First Vienna and Vienna Cricket left the Fußball-Union and joined the ÖFV, Olympia followed them, and the championship was abandoned.

Tagblatt Pokal winners
 1901 Wiener AC 	
 1902 Wiener AC 	
 1903 Wiener AC

References

Football leagues in Austria
1
1
1
1
Recurring events established in 1900
1900 establishments in Austria
1904 disestablishments in Austria
Aus